Uranium compounds are compounds formed by the element uranium (U). Although uranium is a radioactive actinide, its compounds are well studied due to its long half-life and its applications. It usually forms in the +4 and +6 oxidation states, although it can also form in other oxidation states.

Oxidation states and oxides

Oxides 

Calcined uranium yellowcake, as produced in many large mills, contains a distribution of uranium oxidation species in various forms ranging from most oxidized to least oxidized. Particles with short residence times in a calciner will generally be less oxidized than those with long retention times or particles recovered in the stack scrubber.

Phase relationships in the uranium-oxygen system are complex. The most important oxidation states of uranium are uranium(IV) and uranium(VI), and their two corresponding oxides are, respectively, uranium dioxide and uranium trioxide. Other uranium oxides such as uranium monoxide (UO), diuranium pentoxide, and uranium peroxide also exist.

Both oxide forms are solids that have low solubility in water and are relatively stable over a wide range of environmental conditions. Triuranium octoxide is (depending on conditions) the most stable compound of uranium and is the form most commonly found in nature. Uranium dioxide is the form in which uranium is most commonly used as a nuclear reactor fuel. Because of their stability, uranium oxides are generally considered the preferred chemical form for storage or disposal.

Aqueous chemistry 

Salts of many oxidation states of uranium are water-soluble and may be studied in aqueous solutions. A few solid and semi-metallic compounds such as UO and US exist for the formal oxidation state uranium(II), but no simple ions are known to exist in solution for that state. Ions of  liberate hydrogen from water and are therefore considered to be highly unstable. The  ion represents the uranium(VI) state and is known to form compounds such as uranyl carbonate, uranyl chloride and uranyl sulfate.  also forms complexes with various organic chelating agents, the most commonly encountered of which is uranyl acetate.

Unlike the uranyl salts of uranium and polyatomic ion uranium-oxide cationic forms, the uranates, salts containing a polyatomic uranium-oxide anion, are generally not water-soluble.

Carbonates 
The interactions of carbonate anions with uranium(VI) cause the Pourbaix diagram to change greatly when the medium is changed from water to a carbonate containing solution. While the vast majority of carbonates are insoluble in water (students are often taught that all carbonates other than those of alkali metals are insoluble in water), uranium carbonates are often soluble in water. This is because a U(VI) cation is able to bind two terminal oxides and three or more carbonates to form anionic complexes.

Effects of pH 
The uranium fraction diagrams in the presence of carbonate illustrate this further: when the pH of a uranium(VI) solution increases, the uranium is converted to a hydrated uranium oxide hydroxide and at high pHs it becomes an anionic hydroxide complex.

When carbonate is added, uranium is converted to a series of carbonate complexes if the pH is increased. One effect of these reactions is increased solubility of uranium in the pH range 6 to 8, a fact that has a direct bearing on the long term stability of spent uranium dioxide nuclear fuels.

Hydrides, carbides and nitrides 
Uranium metal heated to  reacts with hydrogen to form uranium hydride. Even higher temperatures will reversibly remove the hydrogen. This property makes uranium hydrides convenient starting materials to create reactive uranium powder along with various uranium carbide, nitride, and halide compounds. Two crystal modifications of uranium hydride exist: an α form that is obtained at low temperatures and a β form that is created when the formation temperature is above 250 °C.

Uranium carbides and uranium nitrides are both relatively inert semimetallic compounds that are minimally soluble in acids, react with water, and can ignite in air to form . Carbides of uranium include uranium monocarbide (UC), uranium dicarbide, and diuranium tricarbide. Uranium nitrides obtained by direct exposure of the metal to nitrogen include uranium mononitride (UN), uranium dinitride, and diuranium trinitride.

Halides 

All uranium fluorides are created using uranium tetrafluoride;  itself is prepared by hydrofluorination of uranium dioxide.

At room temperatures,  has a high vapor pressure, making it useful in the gaseous diffusion process to separate the rare uranium-235 from the common uranium-238 isotope. This compound can be prepared from uranium dioxide and uranium hydride by the following process:

 + 4 HF →  + 2  (500 °C, endothermic)
 +  →  (350 °C, endothermic)

The resulting , a white solid, is highly reactive (by fluorination), easily sublimes (emitting a vapor that behaves as a nearly ideal gas), and is the most volatile compound of uranium known to exist.

One method of preparing uranium tetrachloride is to directly combine chlorine with either uranium metal or uranium hydride. All uranium chlorides react with water and air.

Bromides and iodides of uranium are formed by direct reaction of, respectively, bromine and iodine with uranium or by adding  to those element's acids. Stability of the oxyhalides decrease as the atomic weight of the component halide increases.

See also 

 Neodymium compounds
 Protactinium compounds
 Neptunium compounds

References 

 
Compounds
Chemical compounds by element